William Arthur Gaither (April 21, 1910 – October 30, 1970), sometimes known as "Little Bill" Gaither or Leroy's Buddy, was an American blues guitarist and singer.

Biography
Born in Belmont, Bullitt County, Kentucky, Gaither recorded over one hundred songs in the 1930s for labels such as Decca and Okeh. He often wrote and recorded with the pianist George "Honey" Hill.   After his friend Leroy Carr's death in 1935, Gaither was often credited as "Leroy's Buddy".

One of Gaither's most famous blues songs was "Champ Joe Louis", recorded on June 23, 1938, the day after Louis won his rematch against Max Schmeling. The blues scholar Paul Oliver has cited Gaither among a group of important, but understudied, 20th century musicians. His blues lyrics have been appreciated as poetry.

Gaither ran a radio repair shop in Louisville, Kentucky, for some time.  He died in Indianapolis, Indiana, in 1970, and is buried in New Crown Cemetery in Indianapolis.

He is not to be confused with another musician, William Augustus "Bill" Gaither (1927–1985), who recorded with Roy Milton.

See also

The Encyclopedia of Louisville, ed. by J. E. Kleber
The Blues, by H. Elmer, e.g. p. 49

References

External links

 Bill Gaither recordings at the Discography of American Historical Recordings.

Songwriters from Kentucky
American blues guitarists
American male guitarists
American blues singers
People from Bullitt County, Kentucky
1910 births
1970 deaths
20th-century American singers
Blues musicians from Kentucky
Singers from Kentucky
20th-century American guitarists
Guitarists from Kentucky
20th-century American male singers
American male songwriters